Harlot is a 1971 pornographic movie starring Fran Spector, produced by Bill Osco and directed by Michael Benveniste and Howard Ziehm. It is one of the early adult movies of the 1970s, and follows Mona (1970), the first mainstream adult film, also produced by Osco and directed by the team of Benveniste and Ziehm.

It tells the story of a young female student involved in various sexual situations; despite the bad quality of surviving copies, the film has been reprinted a few times also on DVD.

See also
 List of American films of 1971

External links
 

1971 films
1971 drama films
1970s pornographic films
American drama films
Films shot in Los Angeles
1970s English-language films
1970s American films